Erasmus of Arcadia (Greek: Έρασμος της Αρκαδίας), also known as Gerasimos Avlonites (Greek: Γεράσιμος Αυλωνίτης), was a Greek Orthodox bishop of the Diocese of Arcadia in Crete, operating under the Metropolitan of Smyrna.

Erasmus' monastery, located south of Rethymon in central Crete, was a centre of resistance to foreign domination by the Turkish régime. As such, the bishop was driven into exile around 1739. He is regarded as the founder of the first Greek Orthodox congregation in Amsterdam.

Some Methodists believe that the Greek bishop, while visiting London in 1763, consecrated John Wesley as a bishop and ordained several Methodist lay preachers (including John Jones and Thomas Bryant) as priests. However, Wesley could not openly announce his episcopal consecration without incurring the penalty of the Præmunire Act. In light of Erasmus's alleged episcopal consecration of Wesley, some believe that Methodists can assert participation in apostolic succession as understood in the traditional sense, because John Wesley ordained and sent forth every Methodist preacher in his day, who preached and baptized and ordained, and because every Methodist preacher who has ever been ordained as a Methodist has allegedly been ordained in this direct succession from Erasmus. Nevertheless, some people (notably, Augustus Toplady) doubt or condemn Erasmus's consecration of Wesley. According to The Greek Orthodox Theological Review, Bishop Erasmus of the Diocese of Aracadia also ordained other famous clergymen, including Samson Staniforth, Thomas Bryant, Alexander Mather, among other men, as presbyters:

 The eastern prelate was also well respected in London, by men who had known Erasmus in the Ottoman Empire. Greek Orthodox Christians in Amsterdam attribute Erasmus with establishing Orthodoxy there.

References

External links
John Wesley & Gerasimos Avlonites: Two Paintings, authored by Craig Adams

Bishops of the Ecumenical Patriarchate of Constantinople
History of Methodism
Eastern Orthodox bishops in Greece